Messia may refer to:

 Messia gens, family at ancient Rome
 Pedro Messía de la Cerda, 2nd Marquis of Vega de Armijo (1700–1783); a Spanish naval officer
 a harvesting goddess associated with Tutelina
 Agutazza Messia, an illiterate Sicilian woman (a quilt maker and domestic) from whom Giuseppe Pitre takes most of his tales, also in Italo Calvino's folktales collection